Adam Pavlásek was the defending champion but chose not to defend his title.

Maximilian Marterer won the title after defeating Carlos Taberner 6–1, 6–2 in the final.

Seeds

Draw

Finals

Top half

Bottom half

References
Main Draw
Qualifying Draw

Banja Luka Challenger - Singles
2017 Singles